Ilmir is a given name. Notable people with this name include the following:

Ilmir Nasretdinov (born 1987), Energy and Renewables Leader
Ilmir Hazetdinov (born 1991), Russian ski jumper
Ilmir Nurisov (born 1996), Russian footballer
Ilmir Yakupov (born 1994), Russian footballer

See also

Almir (given name)
Elmir
Ilir (name)
Ismir (disambiguation)